

Cameron Village Historic District in Raleigh, North Carolina is a national historic district listed in 2011 on the National Register of Historic Places.  The district encompasses 93 contributing buildings and 1 contributing object and was developed between about 1950 and 1955.  It is considered North Carolina's first planned mixed-use development.

Nearby Village District Shopping Center is not included in the Historic District.

Gallery

See also 
Cameron Village
 List of Registered Historic Places in Wake County, North Carolina

References

External links

 Cameron Village Historic District, RHDC
 National Register Historic Districts in Raleigh, North Carolina, RHDC

Historic districts on the National Register of Historic Places in North Carolina
Modernist architecture in North Carolina
Neighborhoods in Raleigh, North Carolina
National Register of Historic Places in Raleigh, North Carolina